The zero trust security model, also known as zero trust architecture (ZTA), zero trust network architecture or zero trust network access (ZTNA), and sometimes known as perimeterless security, describes an approach to the design and implementation of IT systems. The main concept behind the zero trust security model is "never trust, always verify,” which means that devices should not be trusted by default, even if they are connected to a permissioned network such as a corporate LAN and even if they were previously verified.  ZTNA is implemented by establishing strong identity verification, validating device compliance prior to granting access, and ensuring least privilege access to only explicitly authorized resources. Most modern corporate networks consist of many interconnected zones, cloud services and infrastructure, connections to remote and mobile environments, and connections to non-conventional IT, such as IoT devices. The reasoning for zero trust is that the traditional approach — trusting devices within a notional "corporate perimeter", or devices connected via a VPN — is not relevant in the complex environment of a corporate network. The zero trust approach advocates mutual authentication, including checking the identity and integrity of devices without respect to location, and providing access to applications and services based on the confidence of device identity and device health in combination with user authentication. The zero trust architecture has been proposed for use in specific areas such as supply chains

The principles of zero trust can be applied to data access, and to the management of data. This brings about zero trust data security where every request to access the data needs to be authenticated dynamically and ensure least privileged access to resources. In order to determine if access can be granted, policies can be applied based on the attributes of the data, who the user is, and the type of environment using Attribute-Based Access Control (ABAC). This zero-trust data security approach can protect access to the data.

History 
In April 1994, the term "zero trust" was coined by Stephen Paul Marsh in his doctoral thesis on computer security at the University of Stirling. Marsh's work studied trust as something finite that can be described mathematically, asserting that the concept of trust transcends human factors such as morality, ethics, lawfulness, justice, and judgement.

The problems of the 'Smartie' or 'M&M' model of the network was described by a Sun Microsystems engineer in a Network World article in May 1994, who described fire walls perimeter defence, as a hard shell around a soft centre, "like a Cadbury Egg”.

In 2001 the first version of the OSSTMM (Open Source Security Testing Methodology Manual) was released and this had some focus on trust. Version 3 which came out around 2007 has a whole chapter on Trust which says "Trust is a Vulnerability" and talks about how to apply the OSSTMM 10 controls based on Trust levels. 

In 2003 the challenges of defining the perimeter to an organisation's IT systems was highlighted by the Jericho Forum of this year, discussing the trend of what was then coined "de-perimeterisation".

In 2009, Google implemented a zero trust architecture referred to as BeyondCorp.

In 2010 the term zero trust model was used by analyst John Kindervag of Forrester Research to denote stricter cybersecurity programs and access control within corporations.

However, it would take almost a decade for zero trust architectures to become prevalent, driven in part by increased adoption of mobile and cloud services. 

In 2018, work undertaken in the United States by cybersecurity researchers at NIST and NCCoE led to the publication of SP 800-207, Zero Trust Architecture. The publication defines zero trust (ZT) as a collection of concepts and ideas designed to reduce the uncertainty in enforcing accurate, per-request access decisions in information systems and services in the face of a network viewed as compromised. A zero trust architecture (ZTA) is an enterprise's cyber security plan that utilizes zero trust concepts and encompasses component relationships, workflow planning, and access policies. Therefore, a zero trust enterprise is the network infrastructure (physical and virtual) and operational policies that are in place for an enterprise as a product of a zero trust architecture plan.

There are several ways to implement all the tenets of ZT; a full ZTA solution will include elements of all three:

 Using enhanced identity governance and policy-based access controls.
 Using micro-segmentation
 Using overlay networks and software-defined perimeters

In 2019 the United Kingdom National Cyber Security Centre (NCSC) recommended that network architects consider a zero trust approach for new IT deployments, particularly where significant use of cloud services is planned. An alternative but consistent approach is taken by NCSC, in identifying the key principles behind zero trust architectures:

 Single strong source of user identity
 User authentication
 Machine authentication
 Additional context, such as policy compliance and device health
 Authorization policies to access an application
 Access control policies within an application

See also 
 Trust, but verify (Russian proverb)
 Blast radius
 Password fatigue
 Secure access service edge

References 

Information technology
Computer network security